Emporia is a genus of snout moths. It was described by Ragonot in 1887, and is known from South Africa.

Species
 Emporia grisescens Ragonot, 1887
 Emporia melanobasis Balinsky, 1991

References

Phycitinae